Ishi: The Last of His Tribe (1978) is a made-for-television biopic based on the book Ishi in Two Worlds by Theodora Kroeber. The book relates the experiences of her husband Alfred L. Kroeber who made friends with Ishi, thought to be the last of his people, the Yahi tribe.

The telecast aired first on NBC on December 20, 1978.

The film was written by Christopher Trumbo and father Dalton Trumbo, and directed by Robert Ellis Miller.

Cast

Eloy Casados played the title role.

 Dennis Weaver as Prof. Benjamin Fuller
 Eloy Casados as Ishi (man)
 Joseph Runningfox as Ishi (teenager)
 Michael Medina as Ishi (boy)
 Devon Ericson as Lushi (teenager)
 Patricia Ganera as Lushi (girl)
 Gregory Cruz as Timawi (teenager)
 Eddie Marquez as Timawi (boy)
 Joaquín Martínez as Grandfather
 Geno Silva as Elder Uncle
 Lois Red Elk as Grandmother
 Arliene Nofchissey Williams as Mother
 Dennis Dimster as Tad Fuller
 Wayne Heffley as Sheriff Lockhart
 Peter Brandon as Dr. Robbins
 Missy Gold as Little Girl
 Jay W. MacIntosh as Music Hall Singer
 Ernest D. Paul as Barton

References

External links
 

1978 films
Films about Native Americans
Films directed by Robert Ellis Miller
NBC network original films
1970s English-language films